Aracy de Carvalho Guimarães Rosa (née Aracy Moebius de Carvalho) (December 5, 1908 – February 28, 2011) was a Brazilian diplomatic clerk who has been recognized with the title of Righteous Among the Nations.

Early life
Born to a German mother in Rio Negro, Paraná, Aracy de Carvalho was able to speak German, English, French and her native Portuguese. She moved to São Paulo. She lived there with her German first husband Johannes Edward Ludwig Tess and their child until 1935, when they separated.

Humanitarian Work
In 1936, she was appointed to the Brazilian Consulate in Hamburg, Germany, where she was made the Chief of the Passport Section. She started to help Jewish people during Kristallnacht, on November 9, 1938. She handed out visas to Jews without the red "J" that identified them as such, since Brazilian Dictator Getúlio Vargas non-officially denied visas to Jews. She was in close relations with underground activists in Germany and would even grant visas to Jews that she knew had forged passports.
In 1938 she met fellow diplomat and assistant-Consul João Guimarães Rosa, who would later become her second husband, and one of the most important Brazilian writers. His magnum opus, Grande Sertão: Veredas, was dedicated to her. With his help, she intensified her humanitarian activity, saving a great number of Jews from imprisonment and death. She remained in Germany until 1942, when Brazil broke relations with Germany and joined the Allied Forces.

Recognition
On July 8, 1982, Aracy de Carvalho became one of the two Brazilians honoured by the Yad Vashem with the Righteous Among the Nations award, together with Ambassador Luiz Martins de Souza Dantas.

She is depicted in the 2021 biographical TV miniseries Passport to Freedom. Brazilian actress Sophie Charlotte portrays Aracy de Carvalho.

Death
In her late days Aracy de Carvalho suffered from Alzheimer's disease. She died peacefully at the age of 102, in her home in São Paulo, on February 28, 2011, due to natural causes.

References

Schpun, Mônica Raïsa. Justa. Aracy de Carvalho e o resgate de judeus: trocando a Alemanha nazista pelo Brasil. Rio de Janeiro, Brazil: Civilização Brasileira, 2011, 526 p. .

External links
 Aracy de Carvalho Guimarães Rosa – her activity to save Jews' lives during the Holocaust, at Yad Vashem website

1908 births
2011 deaths
Brazilian diplomats
Brazilian Righteous Among the Nations
Brazilian centenarians
People from Paraná (state)
Brazilian people of German descent
Women centenarians
Deaths from dementia in Brazil
Deaths from Alzheimer's disease